Christian Ferdinand Hartmann (14 July 1774, Stuttgart – 6 January or June 1842, Dresden) was a German portrait and Classical history painter.

Biography 
He was the youngest son of the Ducal finance councilor,  and his wife Juliane Friederike née Spittler (1736–1799), daughter of the Mayor of Cannstatt. His father's home was also a literary salon, frequented by many notable writers, including Goethe, Schiller and Hölderlin.

From 1786 to 1794, he studied painting at the Hohe Karlsschule in Stuttgart. He spent the years 1794 to 1798 in Rome, on a study trip, where his choice of style was influenced by Asmus Carstens. Upon returning, he became a member of the State Academy of Fine Arts. From 1803 to 1809, he was in the employ of Princess Louise of Brandenburg-Schwedt, in Dresden. The following year, he was appointed a Professor at the Dresden Academy of Fine Arts. His students there included  and Woldemar Hottenroth.

During his stay with the Princess, he made the acquaintance of the writer, Heinrich von Kleist. It has been suggested that their friendship helped inspire Kleist to write Das Käthchen von Heilbronn, as Hartmann's only sister, Henriette (1762-1820), had married the lawyer (and amateur artist), whose family had a long history in Heilbronn.

He made a second visit to Rome from 1820 to 1823. In 1825, he was named a member of the Board of Directors of the Dresden Academy.

Sources 
 
 Georg Himmelheber: "Lavater, die Hartmanns und eine unbekannte Zeichnung von Nicolas Guibal". In: Zeitschrift für Württembergische Landesgeschichte #64 (2005), pp. 199–210. 
 
 Edwin H. Zeydel: "Der Maler Ferdinand Hartmann und Ludwig Tiecks Ausgabe der Schriften Kleists. (Mit zwei unbekannten Briefen Tiecks". In: Jahrbuch der Kleist-Gesellschaft, 1933–1937. Edited by Georg Minde-Pouet and Julius Petersen. (Schriften der Kleist-Gesellschaft, Vol.17), pp. 95–97.

External links

1774 births
1842 deaths
18th-century German painters
18th-century German male artists
German portrait painters
Mythological painters
Academic staff of the Dresden Academy of Fine Arts
Artists from Stuttgart
19th-century German painters
19th-century German male artists